Yaipén Brothers is an awarded Peruvian cumbia music group, founded by Walter and Javier Yaipén Brothers.

The group has been awarded several times since 2008, amidst them APDAYC Awards and International Award for "Best Cumbia Group".

Singles 

 "Largate"
 "Ojalá que te mueras"
 "A llorar a otra parte"
 "Corazón Partío"
 "Una rosa lo sabe"
 "Humíllate"
 "Niña Prohibida"

References 

Peruvian musical groups
Cumbia musical groups
Musical groups established in 2008
Sibling musical duos